{{DISPLAYTITLE:C13H10}}
The molecular formula C13H10 (molar mass: 166.22 g/mol, exact mass: 166.0783 u) may refer to:

 Fluorene, or 9H-fluorene
 Phenalene